Bolivia competed at the 2010 Summer Youth Olympics, the inaugural Youth Olympic Games, held in Singapore from 14 August to 26 August 2010.

Medalists

Athletics

Boys
Track and road events

Cycling 

Cross Country

Time Trial

BMX

Road Race

Overall

 * Received -5 for finishing road race with all three racers

Football

Swimming

References

External links
Competitors List: Bolivia – Singapore 2010 official site

2010 in Bolivian sport
Nations at the 2010 Summer Youth Olympics
Bolivia at the Youth Olympics